The  is a subregion of the Chūbu region and Kansai region in Japan that runs along the Pacific Ocean.  The name comes from the Tōkaidō, one of the Edo Five Routes.  Because Tōkai is a sub-region and is not officially classified, there is some disagreement about where exactly the region begins and ends, however Japanese maps widely conclude that the region includes Shizuoka, Aichi, Gifu and Mie prefectures.

The largest major city in the region is Nagoya and the Chūkyō Metropolitan Area (Nagoya Metropolitan Area) makes up a large portion of the region and has Japan's third strongest economy.  The business influence of this urban area sometimes extends out into the outlying areas of the three prefectures centered on Nagoya which are Aichi, Gifu, and Mie; this area is sometimes referred to as the Chūkyō region.

Tōkai is a heavy manufacturing area and is one of the most industrial regions in Japan.  Its coast is lined with densely populated cities with economies that thrive on factories.

The Tōkai region has experienced a number of large earthquakes in the past, including the two great earthquakes in 1944 (also known as the "Tonankai earthquake") and 1945 (also known as the "Mikawa earthquake").  Following the work of Kiyoo Mogi, it is predicted that there is a possibility that the area will be subject to a shallow magnitude 8.0 earthquake in the near future.  Nagoya, Shizuoka, and other large cities would be greatly damaged, with potential casualties in the tens of thousands. The Coordinating Committee for Earthquake Prediction designated the region as an Area of Specific Observation in 1970, and upgraded it to an Area of Intensified Observation in 1974.

Railroads
Central Japan Railway Company, an arm of the former national railway Japan Railways Group, operates in an area roughly coextensive with the Tōkai region. In fact, JR Central's official Japanese name is Tōkai Railway Company, abbreviated to JR-Tōkai ("JR Central" is the English name). JR Central operates the Tōkaidō Main Line between Atami and Maibara stations, as well as the Tōkaidō Shinkansen high speed line between Tokyo and Shin-Ōsaka, and many conventional lines joining with the Tōkaidō Main Line.

Economy 
Economy of Tōkai subregion is largely based on the Chūkyō metropolitan area that lies within its borders. Note that the Chūkyō metropolitan area is also known as Greater Nagoya as the largest and most influential city of the metropolitan area is Nagoya. Automobile giants Toyota and Suzuki are located in Tōkai subregion. Yamaha corporation is also located in Tōkai subregion.

Demographics
Per Japanese census data, and, Tōkai subregion much like Chūkyō metropolitan area has experienced continuous population growth throughout the 20th century.

Since around 2010 though, the Tōkai subregion has experienced population decline.

Major cities 

Designated city
Hamamatsu City:（designated city）
Nagoya City:（designated city, the capital of Aichi Prefecture）
Shizuoka City:（designated city, the capital of Shizuoka Prefecture）
Core city
Gifu City:（core city, the capital of Gifu Prefecture）
Special city
Yokkaichi City:（special city）
Other major cities
Tsu City:（the capital of Mie Prefecture）

Other major cities 
 Toyota City: a core city
 Okazaki City: a core city
 Toyohashi City: a core city
 Ichinomiya City: a special city
 Kasugai City: a special city
 Fuji City: a special city
 Numazu City: a special city

Companies
Toyota Motor Company
Yamaha
Kawai Musical Instruments
Suzuki
Roland Corporation

Universities
Nagoya University
Nanzan University
Nagoya Institute of Technology
Gifu University
Mie University
Chukyo University
Toyohashi University of Technology
Nihon University College of International Relations
Shizuoka University

Airports
Chūbu Centrair International Airport
Nagoya Regional Airport
Shizuoka Airport

Sports clubs

Baseball
Chunichi Dragons

Football
Júbilo Iwata
Nagoya Grampus
Shimizu S-Pulse
F.C. Gifu
Honda F.C.
F.C. Kariya

Basketball
San-en NeoPhoenix
SeaHorses Mikawa
Nagoya Diamond Dolphins

Power generation
The Hamaoka Nuclear Power Plant is located within the Tōkai region.

See also
 Hokuriku region
 Kōshin'etsu region
 Shin'etsu region

Notes

Chūbu region